The Serbian pavilion houses Serbia's national representation during the Venice Biennale arts festivals.

Background

Organization and building 

The pavilion was designed by Brenno Del Giudice in 1932 and built by 1938 as part of a complex on the Giardini's Sant'Elena Island. The buildings, originally allocated to Sweden and Greece, were respectively transferred to Yugoslavia and Romania. Yugoslavia was later renamed Serbia.

Representation by year

Art 

 2012 — Marija Mikovic, Marija Strajnic, Olga Lazarevic, Janko Tadic, Nebojsa Stevanovic, Milos Zivkovic, Aleksandar Ristovic, Nikola Andonov, Milan Dragic and Marko Marovic 
 2015 — Ivan Grubanov (Curator: Lidija Merenik)
 2017 — Milena Dragicevic, Vladislav Scepanovic and Dragan Zdravkovic (Curator: Nikola Suica) 
 2022 — Vladimir Nikolic (Curator: Biljana Ciric)

References

Bibliography

Further reading

External links 

 

National pavilions
Serbian contemporary art